Southern West Riding of Yorkshire was a parliamentary constituency covering part of the historic West Riding of Yorkshire.  It returned two Members of Parliament (MPs) to the House of Commons of the Parliament of the United Kingdom, elected by the bloc vote system.

History 

The constituency was created when the two-member West Riding of Yorkshire constituency was divided for the 1865 general election by the Birkenhead Enfranchisement Act 1861 into two new constituencies, each returning two members: Northern West Riding of Yorkshire and Southern West Riding of Yorkshire. The extra seats were taken from parliamentary boroughs which had been disenfranchised for corruption.

In the redistribution which took effect for the 1868 general election the two divisions were redistributed into three. Eastern West Riding of Yorkshire was created and the Northern and Southern divisions modified. Each of the three divisions returned two members.

All three were abolished by the Redistribution of Seats Act 1885 for the 1885 general election.  The Southern division was replaced by eight new single-member constituencies: Barnsley, Colne Valley, Doncaster, Hallamshire, Holmfirth, Morley, Normanton and Rotherham.

Boundaries
The place of election was at Wakefield.

From 1865 to 1868 the constituency comprised the south half of the West Riding of Yorkshire. The Birkenhead Enfranchisement Act 1861 provided that it was to contain the wapentakes of Barkston Ash, Osgoldcross, Strafforth and Tickhill, Staincross, and Agbrigg.

The Reform Act 1867, as amended by the Boundary Act 1868, re-defined the constituency (as it existed between 1868 and 1885) as the wapentakes of Agbrigg, Strafforth and Tickhill and Staincross.

Members of Parliament

Election results

 

 

 

 Caused by Wentworth-FitzWilliam's resignation.

References

External links 

http://www.craigslist.co.uk/southyorkshire

Parliamentary constituencies in Yorkshire and the Humber (historic)
Constituencies of the Parliament of the United Kingdom established in 1865
Constituencies of the Parliament of the United Kingdom disestablished in 1885
South